Judith Elizabeth Adams (16 May 1945 – 30 September 2017) was an English professor, musculoskeletal radiologist, honorary consultant, and clinical director of the radiology department at Manchester University NHS Foundation Trust.

Career 
Adams obtained a degree in medicine at University College London. She started working as a junior doctor at Addenbrookes Hospital during 1972. Her mentors included pioneers like Sir Godfrey Hounsfield and Sir Charles Dent. She obtained a Fellowship of The Royal College of Radiologists in 1975 and became a lecturer in 1976, senior lecturer in 1979, and a professor in 1993. She also served as the head of the academic department and head of training of the Manchester radiology training scheme, and an honorary consultant at the NHS until she passed away.

Research 
Adams' research primarily focused on osteoporosis-related fractures. She secured well over £5.5 million in research grants throughout her career. She co-authored 273 peer-reviewed scientific papers with 12365 citations recorded by Scopus, 24 invited reviews, and 34 book chapters. She has an h-index of 60.

Selected publications

Memberships 

 Chairman of the ESSR osteoporosis committee.
 Member of the International Skeletal Society in 1986. 
 Member of the European Society of Skeletal Radiologists since 1995.
 Examiner for The Royal College of Radiologists (part I and part II).
 Regional education adviser, member of the council and other boards, dean, and vice president.
 Chair of the regional committee for Clinical Excellence awards.

Awards 
2007: Gold Medal from the International Skeletal Society.
2015: Co-presenter at the annual BRS Dent Lecture in clinical imaging, shared with Professor Ignac Fogelman, by the Bone Research Society.
2016: Gold Medal of the Royal College of Radiologists.
2016: Linda Edwards Award of the National Osteoporosis Society.

Personal life 
Adams was born in 1945 in Liverpool, raised in Zambia, and died in 2017 while working as a professor in Manchester, UK. She enjoyed swimming, horse-riding, and played fencing. She married professor Peter Adams and raised two sons named Charles and James.

References 

British radiologists
1945 births
Scientists from Liverpool
2017 deaths
Date of death missing
Fellows of the Royal College of Radiologists
Women radiologists
Alumni of the UCL Medical School
English medical researchers
Women medical researchers